The She-Wolf is a 1931 American pre-Code drama film directed by James Flood and starring May Robson, James Hall, and Lawrence Gray. It is also known by the alternative title Mother's Millions.

Cast
 May Robson as Harriet Breen 
 James Hall as David Talbot 
 Lawrence Gray as Tom Breen
 Frances Dade as Faire Breen 
 Edmund Breese as William Remington 
 Lillian Harmer as Maria Peppy 
 Leah Winslow as Mrs. Talbot 
 Elinor Flynn as Peggy 
 William L. Thorne as Detective Burke
 Wilson Benge as Remington's Butler (uncredited)
 Frank Darien as Remington's Associate (uncredited)

References

Bibliography
 Darby, William. Masters of Lens and Light: A Checklist of Major Cinematographers and Their Feature Films. Scarecrow Press, 1991.

External links

1931 films
1931 drama films
1930s English-language films
American drama films
Films directed by James Flood
Universal Pictures films
American black-and-white films
1930s American films